Warmfield cum Heath is a civil parish in the City of Wakefield in West Yorkshire, England.  It has a population of 844. increasing to 941 at the 2011 Census.  Until 1974 it formed part of Wakefield Rural District and as of 2004, its under the electoral ward of Normanton. 

The parish consists of the villages of Warmfield in the east, Heath in the west, and Kirkthorpe in the north, and the hamlet of Goosehill north of Warmfield. The A655 road traverses the area of the parish from southwest to northeast, and the southwestern parish boundary follows the A638 road. North of Kirkthorpe, the railway between Wakefield and Normanton passes through the area, but there is no station. At Goosehill there was a junction with the North Midland Railway.

Neighbouring settlements are Agbrigg and Wakefield in the west, Normanton in the northeast, Streethouse in the east, New Sharlston in the southeast, and Walton in the south.

See also
Listed buildings in Warmfield cum Heath

References

Civil parishes in West Yorkshire
Geography of the City of Wakefield